The IPT World Open Eight-ball Championship was an eight-ball pool tournament held between 3–9 September 2006 at the Grand Sierra Resort in Reno, Nevada, by the International Pool Tour. It was the third and last event of the tour It was the richest event in the history of cue sports. The total purse was $3M where $500K was offered to the winner.

Summary
The tournament held a total of 200 players (150 tour members and 50 qualifiers). The players were divided into several groups of certain numbers. Those leading in each group proceeded into the next round where they were placed into new groups. Every match was a race to 8.

Efren Reyes was the victor defeating Rodney Morris 8 games to 6. After the event no new tournaments were held again by the IPT.

Prize fund

See also
 List of world eight-ball champions

References

World championships in pool
2006 in cue sports
2006 in sports in Nevada
Cue sports in the United States
Sports in Reno, Nevada
International sports competitions hosted by the United States
September 2006 sports events in the United States